Isaac Opoku (born 1 September 1975) is a Ghanaian table tennis player. He competed in the men's singles event at the 1996 Summer Olympics.

References

1975 births
Living people
Ghanaian male table tennis players
Olympic table tennis players of Ghana
Table tennis players at the 1996 Summer Olympics
Place of birth missing (living people)